Regester Log House is a historic log house in Fredericktown, Pennsylvania.

At the time the building was added to the National Register of Historic Places in 1974, it consisted of two two-story houses joined in a L-shape, the long side of one house flush with the short side of the other with roofs joined.  Two log houses joined in this manner was an unusual configuration at the time.  Little is documented about the Regester house, the size and manner of joining the two houses places construction of the older house in the second quarter of the 19th century, with the addition sometime later. By 2014, only one of the two houses remained, and apparently slightly relocated, some changes made, and placed on a new foundation.

The building was also designated as a historic residential landmark/farmstead by the Washington County History & Landmarks Foundation.

References

Houses on the National Register of Historic Places in Pennsylvania
Houses completed in 1830
Houses in Washington County, Pennsylvania
1830 establishments in Pennsylvania
National Register of Historic Places in Washington County, Pennsylvania
Log buildings and structures on the National Register of Historic Places in Pennsylvania